In enzymology, an estradiol 6beta-monooxygenase is an enzyme that catalyzes the chemical reaction

estradiol-17beta + AH2 + O2  6beta-hydroxyestradiol-17beta + A + H2O

The 3 substrates of this enzyme are estradiol-17beta, an electron acceptor AH2, and O2, whereas its 3 products are 6beta-hydroxyestradiol-17beta, the reduction product A, and H2O.

This enzyme belongs to the family of oxidoreductases, specifically those acting on paired donors, with O2 as oxidant and incorporation or reduction of oxygen. The oxygen incorporated need not be derive from O miscellaneous.  The systematic name of this enzyme class is estradiol-17beta,hydrogen-donor:oxygen oxidoreductase (6beta-hydroxylating). This enzyme is also called estradiol 6beta-hydroxylase.  This enzyme participates in androgen and estrogen metabolism.

References

 
 

EC 1.14.99
Enzymes of unknown structure